Galamiguitos (English: "Gala's Little Friends") is an American children's programming block that airs on the Spanish language television network Galavisión, which debuted on June 6, 1999 and aired until December 15, 2002. The one-hour block – which airs Monday to Friday mornings and Saturday and Sunday mornings from 10:00 a.m. to 11:30 a.m. Eastern Time and Pacific Time – features live-action aimed at children between the ages of 2 and 8.

Programs featured on the block consist almost entirely of Spanish-dubbed versions of series that were originally produced and broadcast in English. All shows featured on Galamiguitos are designed to meet federally mandated educational programming guidelines defined by the Federal Communications Commission (FCC) via the Children's Television Act.

History
On June 6, 1999, Galavisión announced that it would debuted children's program block, called Galamiguitos within aimed at preschools the fulfilled educational programming requirements defined by the Federal Communications Commission's Children's Television Act and children between the ages of 2 and 8. The preschool block's initial lineup consisted within three/four live-action shows of the 90-minute weekday block of children's programming, the entering the agreement with production company by Nine Network in Australia (Here's Humphrey) and Radical Sheep Productions (The Big Comfy Couch), Spanish-language and dubbed American, Canadian and European children's programs.

Galamiguitos was the final time on the channel. However, the block was discontinued on December 15, 2002.

Programming

Current programming

Former programming

See also
 Planeta U - The weekend morning children's block on Univision
 Toonturama - The Saturday and Sunday morning cartoon block on UniMás (formerly known as TeleFutura)
 Univision y Los Niños - The Monday to Friday and Saturday morning block on Univision from 1989 to 1990.
 La Piñata Loca - The host of George Ortuzar from Saturday and Sunday morning block on Univision from 1996 to 2000.

References

Univision original programming
Television programming blocks in the United States
1999 American television series debuts
2002 American television series endings
Preschool education television networks